Prince Louis may refer to:

Princes of Condé

Louis, Prince of Condé (1530–1569), prominent Huguenot leader and general, the founder of the House of Condé
Louis, Grand Condé (1621–1686), French general
Louis, Prince of Condé (1668–1710) prince du sang at the French court of Louis XIV
Louis Joseph, Prince of Condé (1736–1818), Prince du sang
Louis Henri, Prince of Condé (1756 - 1830), brother-in-law of Philippe Égalité
Louis Henri, Duke of Bourbon (1692–1740), prime minister to his kinsman Louis XV

Princes of Conti

François Louis, Prince of Conti (1664–1709), Prince de Conti
Louis Armand I, Prince of Conti (1661–1685), son-in-law of Louis XIV
Louis Armand II, Prince of Conti (1695–1727), Prince of Conti
Louis François, Prince of Conti (1717–1776), French nobleman
Louis François Joseph, Prince of Conti (1734–1814), last Prince of Conti

Others
Prince Louis, Count of Aquila (1824–1897), member of the House of Bourbon-Two Sicilies
Prince Louis, Count of Trani (1838–1886), son of Ferdinand II of the Two Sicilies
Prince Louis of Battenberg (1854–1921), British naval officer and German prince
Louis II, Prince of Monaco (1870–1949), Prince of Monaco
Prince Louis of Luxembourg (born 1986), son of Grand Duke Henri and Cuban-born Grand Duchess Maria Teresa
Prince Louis of Wales (born 2018), son of William, Prince of Wales

See also
King Louis (disambiguation)
 Louis (disambiguation)